Nick Barat (born January 25, 1981), better known by his stage name Nick Catchdubs, is an American record producer and DJ from New Jersey. He is a co-founder of Fool's Gold Records. He has also served as an associate editor at The Fader. In 2013, Stereogum called him "the best party DJ in the game right now." He resides in Brooklyn, New York.

Career
In 2012, Barat released After Hours, a collaborative mixtape with rapper Jackie Chain. It was chosen by Stereogum as their Mixtape of the Week. In that year, he performed live with Danny Brown at the MoMA PS1's Warm Up. In 2013, he released his first single, "Bizness", which featured vocal contributions from Iamsu! and Jay Ant. In 2014, he released "Wuts That", a single which featured rapper B.I.C. In 2015, he released his first studio album, Smoke Machine. It featured guest appearances from the likes of Troy Ave, Heems, Iamsu!, and Jay Ant. Consequence of Sound gave the album a grade of B−, calling it "a damn good record to spin at a party this summer." In 2019, he released a studio album, UFO.

Discography

Studio albums
 Smoke Machine (2015)
 UFO (2019)

Compilation albums
 UFO RMX (2019)

Mixtapes
 After Hours (2012)

EPs
 More Smoke (2015)
 ATM (2019)
 Pour Decisions (2020)

Singles
 "Wuts That" (2013)
 "Bizness" (2014)
 "Dip Dip" (2017)
 "UFO Style" (2018)
 "All Night" (2018)
 "Pick Up Yaself" (2018)

DJ mixes
 Wale - 100 Miles & Running (2007)
 Wale - The Mixtape About Nothing (2008)
 Izza Kizza - Kizzaland (2008)
 Izza Kizza - The Wizard of Iz (2009)
 Wale & 9th Wonder - Back to the Feature (2009)
 Kid Sister - Kiss Kiss Kiss (2011)

References

External links
 
 

1981 births
Living people
American electronic musicians
American hip hop record producers
American hip hop DJs
Musicians from New Jersey
American company founders